Thomas Simon Winslade (born 28 May 1990) is an English cricketer.  Winslade is a right-handed batsman who bowls right-arm off break.  He was born in Epsom, Surrey.

While studying for his degree at Loughborough University, Winslade made his only first-class appearance for Loughborough MCCU against Kent in 2010.  Opening the batting in this match, he scored a single run in Loughborough's first-innings, before being dismissed Simon Cook, while in their second-innings he was dismissed for 17 by Joe Denly, with the match ending in a draw.

References

External links
Tom Windslade at ESPNcricinfo
Tom Winslade at CricketArchive

1990 births
Living people
Alumni of Loughborough University
Cricketers from Epsom
English cricketers
Loughborough MCCU cricketers